The N4 road in Belgium is a highway that runs from Brussels to Luxembourg. It starts as  chaussée de Wavre at Porte de Namur on the Brussels inner ring and runs south east through Wavre and Namur, Marche-en-Famenne, Bastogne, Martelange and Arlon before terminating as route de Luxembourg at the Luxembourg border. On its route is crosses the Meuse and Lessive Rivers and the Belgian Ardennes.

Before the development of motorways the N4 was a main artery for traffic going south east from Brussels and it was dotted with many friteries, cafes and petrol stations.

From the 1960s to the end of the 1980s, it has been superseded by the completion of the A4 motorway which runs from Delta in Brussels down past Arlon where shortly after it enters Luxembourg where it becomes part of the Luxembourg by-pass system until it reaches the south of the city where it turns south continuing down to Thionville and Metz in France and onwards. By diverting the traffic away from the N4 the motorway has caused the closure of most of these traditional Belgian friteries.

Outside of major towns the N4 mostly consists of dual carriageway with the opposing lanes separated by a central reservation or concrete blocks, but certain sections are still without any form of physical separation and have been the scene of many fatal accidents.

The N4 still offers a more pleasurable and scenic route to the south of Belgium for the less pressed driver and for bicyclists. The end sections remain busy routes during the rush hour due to the high number of commuters travelling to and from Brussels and Luxembourg from residential communities all over the area. Stretches of the road continue to be renovated.

See also

 Province of Luxembourg
 Province of Namur
 Province of Walloon Brabant

External links
  Traffic information in Belgium

004
Roads in Brussels